Navicula festiva is a species of algae in the family Naviculaceae which occurs in North American rivers.

References

festiva
Species described in 1963